A Star Is Born is a 1976 American musical romantic drama film directed by Frank Pierson, written by Pierson, John Gregory Dunne, and Joan Didion. Starring Barbra Streisand as an unknown singer and Kris Kristofferson as an established rock and roll star who fall in love, only to find her career ascending while his goes into decline. A Star Is Born premiered at the Mann Village Theater on December 18, 1976, with a wide release by Warner Bros. the following day. A huge box office success, grossing $80 million on a $6 million budget in North America, the film became the 2nd highest-grossing that year. Reviews praised its performances and musical score, but criticized the screenplay and runtime. At the 49th Academy Awards, the film won Best Original Song for its love theme "Evergreen".

The film is a remake of the 1937 original with Janet Gaynor and Fredric March, notably adapted in 1954 as a musical starring Judy Garland and James Mason; and subsequently again in 2018 with Lady Gaga and Bradley Cooper.

Plot
John Norman Howard, a famous and self-destructive singer/songwriter rock star, arrives late for a concert. He is drunk, sings a couple of songs, and walks off stage. John's driver takes him to a bar where Esther Hoffman is singing. One of John's fans finds him there and starts a fight. Esther grabs John and helps him escape out a back door.

They go to Esther's, but she invites him to come back for breakfast. Over breakfast (pepperoni pizza), she agrees to go to a concert with him. After arriving by helicopter, John rides a motorbike around the stage, snags a cable and crashes off the front of the stage. John is taken away by ambulance and his entourage leave in the helicopter; forgetting Esther.

Afterwards, John is resting at home by his pool. A radio DJ, Bebe Jesus, hovers over the pool in a helicopter and invites John to his studio. John gets angry and shoots at the helicopter. Bebe Jesus then threatens to never play John's songs. Later, John goes to the radio station with a case of whiskey to make peace with Bebe Jesus. The disc jockey does not accept John's apology and calls John an alcoholic over the air. Esther happens to be at the radio station at the same time, taping a commercial. John takes Esther to his mansion and writes her name on the wall with a can of spray paint. There, they make love, have a bubble bath together, and he listens to her playing his piano. She thinks no one would be able to sing to the tune she has written, but he makes up some lyrics and starts singing.

At his next concert, John gets Esther on stage to sing. Although the audience boos when she starts to sing, she wins them over. Later, she tells John she wants them to get married. John replies that he's no good for her, but she persists, and they marry.  John takes Esther to a plot of land he has out west where they build a simple house. She wants a tour co-starring with him, but he thinks she should do the tour on her own. Esther's career takes off, eclipsing his.

John returns to the studio thinking of restarting his career. He's told by Bobbie that the band has gone on without him and have renamed themselves. To save face, John asks Bobbie to tell them that he's found some new artists to work with and wishes them luck.

At home alone, John begins to write a new song. As he sings, he is constantly interrupted by the telephone. Someone asks for Esther and wants to know whether he is her secretary. When Esther returns home, she wants to find out how it went with the band and John tells her it didn't work out. He changes the subject to find out about Esther's day and goes through the messages he's taken for her, one of which is that she's up for a Grammy Award.

At the Grammy Awards, Esther wins for best female performance. While she is giving her acceptance speech, John arrives late and drunk and makes a scene. Later, Esther tries to talk Brian into giving John a last chance. John is writing songs again but in a different way. Brian calls on John and likes the new songs, but suggests John release some of his old hits along with the new songs. However, John wants to go with the new work only, so he turns down the offer.

Back at his LA mansion, John finds Quentin, a magazine writer, swimming half-naked in his swimming pool. She says she would do anything to get an exclusive interview.  Initially he thinks it's with him, but she confirms it's an interview with Esther that she wants. When Esther arrives soon after, she finds them in bed together. Quentin tries to interview Esther, but John tells Quentin to get out.  Esther and John fight with another, him telling her “I love you” and she “I hate you”, until Esther confesses that she does love him.  They return to their small home out west, where they have been happiest.

One day, John wakes early and tells Esther he's going to pick up Brian from the airport. Esther asks him to hurry back. John leaves the house with a beer in hand and drives off in his flashy sports car. He leaves playing his track “Watch Closely Now” but gets bored and puts on one of Esther's songs. He continues to drink his beer, while driving too fast and recklessly.

In the next scene, a police dispatch is discussing an accident.  The shell of a red sports car is on its side. A helicopter lands at the scene and Esther and Brian run out towards John, whose dead body is covered by a blanket. Esther asks for another blanket and cleans his face. She lies down on John and while crying she asks him what is she supposed to do without him. He is taken away in an ambulance.
 
Back at the LA mansion, Esther hears John's voice calling out for someone to answer the telephone. But she discovers it's just a tape of the old songwriting session during which the telephone had interrupted his singing. She cries on the step in the now empty house, saying that he was a liar and he wasn't supposed to leave her.

The final scene is what seems to be a memorial concert for John. Esther walks out and is introduced as Esther Hoffman-Howard. The audience raises candles as a tribute to her late husband. She sings the song John wrote for her “With One More Look at You” and then ends with his famous track, “Watch Closely Now”, done in her own style. At the last beat of the song, Esther spreads her arms wide and looks up to the heavens.

Cast

Production
Directed by Frank Pierson, the film updates the original story and screenplay of William A. Wellman and Robert Carson with additional contributions by Pierson, John Gregory Dunne and Joan Didion. It also features Gary Busey and Sally Kirkland. Venetta Fields and Clydie King perform as Streisand's backing vocalists "The Oreos". Kristofferson's then-wife Rita Coolidge and Tony Orlando appear briefly as themselves.

The earlier films had portrayed the behind-the-scenes world of Hollywood filmmaking. However, this version adapted the story to the music business. For example, the 1937 and 1954 films each portrayed the lead female character winning an Academy Award, while the 1976 and 2018 versions depicted the heroine winning a Grammy Award instead.

A Star Is Born was co-produced by Streisand and her then-partner Jon Peters for Barwood Films and Warner Brothers, with Peters and Streisand as producers and Streisand as executive producer. Among actors considered for the male lead were Neil Diamond and Marlon Brando. Streisand and Peters wanted Elvis Presley for the role: they met with Elvis and discussed the film, and he was interested in taking the part, thinking it would revive his film career. Elvis' manager, Colonel Tom Parker, insisted Elvis have top billing and asked for a substantial sum of money for the role, even though he had not had an acting role since 1969, and people were unsure what kind of box office draw he would be. This effectively ended Elvis's involvement with the project. Parker also did not want to have Elvis portrayed as having a show business career in decline because this was far from the truth, with Elvis playing to packed auditoriums wherever he toured in the States. Diamond, who knew Streisand and had attended high school with her at Erasmus Hall High School in Brooklyn, was also seriously considered but had to decline due to his extensive concert commitments, and Kristofferson got the part of John Norman Howard.

Kristofferson denied modelling his character on Jim Morrison: "That's a good idea but it's not true. I don't think I ever met Morrison. A lot of people said we looked alike – shirts off, beards – but that washed-up rock star was more about me."

The film cost around $6 million to produce. Its soundtrack album was also an international success, reaching number 1 in many countries and selling nearly 15 million copies worldwide. It featured the ballad "Evergreen (Love Theme from A Star Is Born)", which became one of the biggest hits of Streisand's career, spending three weeks at number one in the United States, and peaking at number three in the United Kingdom.

The filming locations included many in Arizona such as downtown Tucson, Tucson Community Center, Sonoita and Tempe, including Sun Devil Stadium.  Streisand's wardrobe was selected from her own personal clothing. The film credit reads: "Miss Streisand's clothes from... her closet".  The film was choreographed by David Winters of West Side Story fame, who worked closely with Streisand to perfect the movie's dancing sequences.

Reception

Box office

The film entered general release in the United States on December 19, 1976. It grossed $80 million at the U.S. box office, making it the 2nd highest grossing picture of 1976.

Critical reception
On review aggregator website Rotten Tomatoes, the film received an approval rating of 35% based on 40 reviews, with an average rating of 5.4/10. The site's consensus states; "A lack of memorable music, chemistry between its leads, and an overlong runtime prompts this modish iteration of A Star is Born to fizzle out quickly." On Metacritic, the film has a weighted average score of 58 out of 100 based on 8 critics, indicating "mixed or average reviews".

Roger Ebert gave the film two and a half stars out of four, writing in his review, "There is, to begin with, no denying Barbra Streisand's enormous talent. At the end of 'A Star Is Born' the camera stays on her for one unbroken shot of seven or eight minutes, and she sings her heart out, and we concede that she's one of the great stars of the movies, one of the elemental presences...I thought Miss Streisand was distractingly miscast in the role, and yet I forgave her everything when she sang." Gene Siskel also gave the film two and a half stars, calling it "a lumbering love story made palatable by Streisand's superb singing." Variety was positive, calling Streisand's performance "her finest screen work to date, while Kris Kristofferson's portrayal of her failing benefactor realizes all the promise first shown five years ago in 'Cisco Pike.' Jon Peters' production is outstanding, and Frank Pierson's direction is brilliant." Vincent Canby of The New York Times called it "a transistorized remake, louder than ever, but very small in terms of its being about anything whatsoever." He also noted that Kristofferson "walks through the film looking very bored." Charles Champlin of the Los Angeles Times wrote, "The treatment of Streisand is so ceaselessly close up and reverential from the start that there really seems nowhere to go but further up, and little of the mutuality of need that is essential to a love, or a love story ... A half-hour in, I wrote 'a star is boring' in my notes, and was not later persuaded I'd been wrong." Gary Arnold of The Washington Post suggested that the film "should be retitled 'A Star is Embalmed" or "A Star is Entombed' or simply 'A Star is Lost' .... One loses sight of the ostensible dramatic tragedy, because the real tragedy appears to be Streisand's misuse of her talent." Geoff Brown of The Monthly Film Bulletin faulted the film for "Streisand's failure to convince as a rock star, even when singing the docile brand of rock supplied here. Luckily, Kris Kristofferson makes a far better impression. His eyes have the proper faraway look that betokens a mind besotted either with booze or love, and he drifts toward his destiny with none of James Mason's fireworks but with a great deal of quiet charm."

In Mad (magazine) issue #193 dated September '77, the movie was parodied in their "Rock of Aged Dept." as "A Star's a Bomb." (https://www.comics.org/issue/93993/)

Awards and nominations

In the 1937 and 1954 versions, Janet Gaynor and Judy Garland were each depicted on screen as winning an Academy Award, yet neither won for their film in real life (though Gaynor and Streisand had won Oscars before, and Garland had won an Academy Juvenile Award). In this film, Barbra Streisand is instead depicted as winning a Grammy Award (in real life, the film's song "Evergreen" won her both a Grammy Award for Song of the Year and an Academy Award for Best Original Song).

According to at least one Streisand biography, unhappy with a few of Frank Pierson's scenes, Streisand later directed them herself (a claim also made for 1979's The Main Event), adding to the rumors that she and Pierson clashed constantly during production.

The film is recognized by American Film Institute in these lists:
 2004: AFI's 100 Years...100 Songs:	
 "Evergreen (Love Theme from A Star Is Born)" – #16

Remakes
A Star Is Born was the second remake of the original 1937 drama, the prior being the 1954 musical starring Judy Garland and James Mason. The story was also  adapted as the 2013 Bollywood film Aashiqui 2.  Bradley Cooper later starred, directed, co-wrote, and co-produced a 2018 retelling, with Lady Gaga co-starring and composing new music for the film. All four of the official "A Star is Born" movies have been nominated for at least four Academy Awards. In August 2021, while promoting her upcoming album, Streisand suggested that the 2018 film was unoriginal and the “wrong idea” despite her version also being a remake and despite her clear and apparent support & praise of the project both during production and after theatrical release.

Home media

In 2006, the Region 1 DVD was released in North America in Dolby Digital 5.1 sound with various extras, including a full-length commentary by Barbra Streisand, 16 minutes of never-before-seen and additional footage, and the original wardrobe test. In 2007, the Region 2 DVD with the same extras was released in Germany. In 2008, the Region 4 DVD was released in Australia, the content of which appears to be the same as the Region 1 edition. The DVD has yet to be released in any other region.

Warner Bros. released the film worldwide on the Blu-ray format on February 6, 2013. The DVD and Blu-ray reissues were released as manufacture-on-demand titles on May 14, 2019 by Warner Archive Collection who also reissued the DVD and Blu-ray formats for the 1954 adaption that day.

Soundtrack

The soundtrack album to the film was released by Columbia Records in 1976.

References

External links

 
 
 
 
 
 Records/A Star is Born Barbra Streisand Archives
 "My Battles With Barbra and Jon", New West magazine article by director Frank Pierson
 The Village Voice article on the making of the film

1976 films
1976 romantic drama films
1970s musical drama films
1970s American films
Films set in Arizona
Films shot in Arizona
American musical drama films
American rock music films
American romantic drama films
American romantic musical films
American independent films
Musical film remakes
Films directed by Frank Pierson
Films about alcoholism
1976 independent films
Warner Bros. films
Best Musical or Comedy Picture Golden Globe winners
Films that won the Best Original Song Academy Award
Films featuring a Best Musical or Comedy Actor Golden Globe winning performance
Films featuring a Best Musical or Comedy Actress Golden Globe winning performance
First Artists films
Barwood Films films
Albums produced by Phil Ramone
Films produced by Jon Peters
1970s English-language films